The Ministry of Land Reform was a government ministry of Namibia, with headquarters in Windhoek. It was created at Namibian independence in 1990 as Ministry of Lands, Resettlement and Rehabilitation, renamed Ministry of Lands and Resettlement in 2005, and got its last name change in 2015. In 2020 the ministry was disestablished, and the portfolio of land reform was given to the agriculture ministry. 

The first Namibian land reform minister was Marco Hausiku. The  minister of Agriculture, Water and Land Reform is Calle Schlettwein.

Ministers
All land reform ministers in chronological order are:

See also
Land reform in Namibia

References

Land reform
Land reform
Agriculture in Namibia
1990 establishments in Namibia
2020 disestablishments in Namibia